North Parade, or more formally North Parade Avenue, is a short shopping street in north Oxford, England. It runs between Winchester Road opposite Church Walk to the west and Banbury Road (with Norham Road slightly north opposite) to the east. It is the only shopping street in North Oxford between the city centre to the south and Summertown to the north.

Overview 
North Parade has been described as "one of the most interesting little streets in Oxford." It has pubs, shops and houses along the street. Over the years, local shops have given way to restaurants.

The Rose & Crown public house is on the north side and the Gardeners Arms pub is on the south side.

There are some additional commercial establishments stretching a little way south from North Parade along the Banbury Road. In particular, Gee's restaurant with its glasshouse structure, which used to be a florist and greengrocer, has been a restaurant since 1983.

History
The land at North Parade sold as 42 lots at an auction held at the Horse & Jockey public house in May 1833. Most of the land between St Giles' and Summertown was owned by St John's College, Oxford and was sold as leasehold. As North Oxford was developed as a suburb, North Parade became a small local shopping centre for the residences in the area.

North Parade used to have traditional local shops. With the changes in people's shopping habits, most of the shops have moved up-market in their style. Shops such as a butchers, grocers, fishmongers, etc., have given way to gift shops, restaurants, etc. A monthly outdoor farmers market was established in 2012.

Origin of the name
North Parade runs south of South Parade in Summertown. It is often claimed that during the Civil War when Charles I was besieged by Oliver Cromwell at Oxford, South Parade was the Roundhead southern front, while North Parade was the location of the Royalist northern front during the siege of Oxford. However, "[i]t is unlikely that the two sides would have come so close to each other without engaging in combat and, in any case, parade grounds are known to have existed elsewhere in and around the town", for instance in Port Meadow. In fact, both developments are much later:

The Rose & Crown
The Rose & Crown is a pub established in 1863, and has been run by the current landlord since 1983. Regular drinkers at the Rose & Crown have included Thom Yorke of the band Radiohead, who wrote songs there.

Literature
North Parade was mentioned by John Betjeman (1906–1984) in his poetry:

References

External links
 North Parade Market website

Streets in Oxford
Shopping streets in Oxford
History of Oxford